John Ballantyne Cairns KCVO KStJ (born 1942) is a retired minister of the Church of Scotland.

Following a career as a solicitor, he studied theology and was ordained in 1974. His first charge was as minister at the parishes of Langholm, Ewes and Westerkirk. He then became minister at  Riverside Parish Church, Dumbarton (1985-2001). He then served as minister of Aberlady and Gullane Parish Churches, East Lothian, until retiring in 2008. In retirement, he is serving (as of 2011) as part-time locum minister at St Columba's Church, London. His formal title (following the end of his Moderatorial year) is the Very Reverend Dr John Cairns.

He was Moderator of the General Assembly of the Church of Scotland in 1999-2000 and was appointed Chaplain to the Queen in 1997. He became Dean of the Chapel Royal in Scotland in 2006. He has also held convenerships of several General Assembly boards and committees.

The General Assembly over which he moderated was uniquely held in the Edinburgh International Conference Centre. This was to allow the Scottish Parliament to meet in the Church's Assembly Hall.

Honours
On 12 July 2013 Cairns was appointed Knight Commander of the Royal Victorian Order. (KCVO)  On 15 January 2013 he was appointed Commander of the Order of St John. (CStJ) and promoted to  Knight of Justice of the Order of St John. (GCStJ)

Honour Ribbons:
: Knight Grand Cross of the Royal Victorian Order (GCVO)
: Knight of the Order of St. John (KStJ)

See also
List of Moderators of the General Assembly of the Church of Scotland

References

1942 births
Living people
20th-century Ministers of the Church of Scotland
21st-century Ministers of the Church of Scotland
Moderators of the General Assembly of the Church of Scotland
Deans of the Chapel Royal in Scotland
Knights Commander of the Royal Victorian Order